The Taiwan barbet (Psilopogon nuchalis), also known as the embroidered barbet, is a species of bird endemic to the country of Taiwan.

Taxonomy
It was formerly considered a subspecies of the black-browed barbet (Psilopogon oorti) and placed in the genus Megalaima.

Description
The plumage is mostly green. The lore has a red spot. The ear-coverts and lower malar are blue. The throat is mustard yellow. The forehead is yellow. There is a black stripe above the eye. The beak is black and thick. The breast has a blue band and a red band. The belly is yellowish-green. The feet are greyish. The sexes are alike.

Name
In Taiwan, the bird is known as the "five-colored bird", referring to the five colors on its plumage. Because of its colorful plumage and that its call resembles that of a percussion instrument known as a wooden fish, the species is also referred to as the "colorful monk" by Taiwanese.

Habitat and ecology
It feeds on fruits and insects. The breeding season is from March to August. It nests in tree cavities. It may use an existing cavity or excavate one.

See also
List of endemic species of Taiwan

References

Taiwan barbet
Endemic birds of Taiwan
Taiwan barbet
Taiwan barbet